Herne power plant is a coal-fired power plant located at Herne in North Rhine-Westphalia, Germany. It was constructed in 1962. The installed capacity of the plant is 950 megawatts. The power plant is owned and operated by Evonik Steag GmbH, a subsidiary of Evonik Industries.

In the 1980s, a fourth unit was added to the three older blocks. During this construction the high, 300 metre tall chimney and the large cooling tower, whose shape is present in the picture of the power station, were built. The power station annually produces approx. 5.2 billion kWh electrical power and 800 million kWh of long-distance heating. Annual coal consumption amounts to approx. 2 million tons.

External links

 http://www.skyscraperpage.com/diagrams/?b5018

Energy infrastructure completed in 1962
Energy infrastructure completed in 1989
Towers completed in 1989
Towers in Germany
Coal-fired power stations in Germany
Buildings and structures in Herne, North Rhine-Westphalia
Chimneys in Germany
Economy of North Rhine-Westphalia